Udalovka (Ala-Kayıñ) is a rural locality (a selo) in Turochaksky District, the Altai Republic, Russia. The population was 160 as of 2016. There are 2 streets.

Geography 
Udalovka is located 23 km northwest of Turochak (the district's administrative centre) by road. Dmitriyevka and Turochak are the nearest rural localities.

References 

Rural localities in Turochaksky District